Battle-Sphere is a 2-player science fiction combat board game that was published by Sten Productions in 1978.

Gameplay
Battle-Sphere is a game which involves a group of rebel ships assaulting an imperial Battle-Sphere that is stranded and defenseless without a necessary component. The Imperial player tries to deliver the missing component; the rebel player tries to either destroy the Battle-Sphere before it is operational again, or destroy the ship that is delivering the component. If the Imperial player is able to repair the Battle-Sphere, its powerful armament will usually overwhelm the rebels.

Components
The game comes with the following components:
 18" x 14" map
 game rules
 fictional explanatory notes
 cardboard counters for the rebel and Imperial ships

Victory conditions
The player with the most victory points at the end of the game is the winner:
 Imperial Battle-Sphere is worth 7 points (awarded to Imperial player if it survives, to the Rebel player if it is destroyed)
 Rebel captain is worth 3 points (awarded to the Imperial player if the captain dies, to the Rebel player if the captain survives)

Reception
In the June 1979 edition of Dragon (Issue #26), Tony Watson called Battle-Sphere "a fairly clever, if simple, game. It is ideal for an evening of easy gaming, but still requires enough thought to make it all interesting."

References

Board games introduced in 1978